The Mountain Fork Bridge is a historic bridge in rural Polk County, Arkansas. It carries County Road 38 across Mountain Fork Creek north of Hatfield and southwest of Mena. The bridge's construction date and builder are unknown; it predates the standardization of bridge designs in the state in 1923. It is estimated to date to the early 1900s.

The bridge was listed on the National Register of Historic Places in 1990.

Design
The Mountain Fork Bridge is an example of a pony Pratt steel truss bridge.

See also
List of bridges documented by the Historic American Engineering Record in Arkansas
List of bridges on the National Register of Historic Places in Arkansas
National Register of Historic Places listings in Polk County, Arkansas

References

External links

Road bridges on the National Register of Historic Places in Arkansas
Historic American Engineering Record in Arkansas
National Register of Historic Places in Polk County, Arkansas
Steel bridges in the United States
Transportation in Polk County, Arkansas